A Virtual POS (Point of Sale) is typically a web or windows application that can be used by card-accepting merchants to manually authorize card transactions. Most Payment Services Providers offer this type of functionality.

Retail point of sale systems